Bolboschoenus maritimus is a species of flowering plant from family Cyperaceae. Common names for this species include sea clubrush, cosmopolitan bulrush, alkali bulrush, saltmarsh bulrush, and bayonet grass. It is found in seaside wetland habitats over much of the world. It is widespread across much of temperate and subtropical Africa, Asia,  Europe,  North America, South America and various islands.

Habitat 
As a halophyte, B. maritimus is usually found in saline habitats, including the northern coast of the North and Baltic Sea, Scandinavia, and in coastal western and southern Europe, as well as inland in northern Poland, Pannonia, and as far east as the Ural Mountains. B. maritimus often dominates in areas with saline, muddy substrates that are rich in minerals with substantial water level fluctuations that typically flood in spring and early summer. However these habitats have grown in economic importance and are used intensively for livestock grazing, which has led to the disappearance of B. maritimus from its historical range, exacerbated by land reclamation, invasive species, and conversion to arable land.

References

External links
Jepson Manual Treatment
USDA Plants Profile
PlantZAfrica.com
Washington Burke Museum
Photo gallery

maritimus
Flora of Africa
Flora of Asia
Flora of Europe
Flora of North America
Flora of South America
Plants described in 1753
Salt marsh plants
Taxa named by Carl Linnaeus
Taxa named by Eduard Palla